Bad Sulza is a town in the Weimarer Land district, in Thuringia, Germany. It is situated on the river Ilm, 15 km southwest of Naumburg, and 18 km north of Jena.

History
Within the German Empire (1871-1918), Bad Sulza was part of the Grand Duchy of Saxe-Weimar-Eisenach. The former municipality Ködderitzsch was merged into Bad Sulza in January 2019, and Saaleplatte in December 2019. In January 2023 Bad Sulza absorbed the former municipality Rannstedt.

Notable citizens 

 Johann Agricola (1590-1668), superintendent of the salt plant from 1622 to 1631, used the healing power of Sulza brine for therapeutic purposes.
 Adolf Piltz (1855-1940), German mathematician notable for his work in number theory.

Associated with the city 
 Thomas Naogeorgus (actually Kirchmair) (1508-1563), theologian, Neo-Latin poet and playwright

References

External links

Weimarer Land
Grand Duchy of Saxe-Weimar-Eisenach
Spa towns in Germany